William Otis Crosby (January 14, 1850, Decatur , Byrd Township, Brown County, Ohio - 31 December 1925, Boston) - American geologist and engineer, Professor of the Massachusetts Institute of Technology (1906), a member of the American Academy of Arts and Sciences (1881).

Biography 
He graduated from the Massachusetts Institute of Technology (1876), receiving a bachelor's degree.

Since 1875, while still a student, he was an assistant in geology and mineralogy in the Boston Society of Natural History, where he worked under the guidance of the famous paleontologist Alpheus Hyatt.

After graduating from the Massachusetts Institute of Technology, he was invited to the position of instructor at the same institute in the Department of Geology (1878-1883).

In 1881 he was elected a member of the American Academy of Arts and Sciences in Cambridge, Massachusetts.

In 1883 he received the post of assistant and held this post until 1902. Then he worked as an assistant professor (1902-1906) and professor of mineralogy and lithology until 1907, when progressive deafness led him to the need for resignation.

Head of the Department of Geology of the Massachusetts Institute of Technology (1906-1907). In total, 54 years have been associated with this institute.

After the termination of teaching activity and until the end of his life, he worked as an expert consultant on the construction of engineering structures. 
He died in Boston on December 31, 1925.

Scientific and engineering activities 
Teaching at the Institute was combined with extensive scientific and engineering activities. The research covered such areas as mineralogy, igneous rocks, glaciology, physical geography, metamorphism, economic geology, fracture disturbance and tectonics, coral reefs, engineering geology and groundwater.

He gave one of the first classifications of fractured disturbance of rock massifs (1882).

He advised projects in the United States, Alaska, Mexico and Spain. Among them such as Catskill Aqueduct, Muscle Shoals, Alabama, Arrowrock Dam, La Boquilla Dam in Chihuahua (Mexico) and others.

Awards, recognition 
Member of the American Academy of Arts and Sciences (1881)

Member of the Geological Society of America

Member of the Seismological Society of America

Member of the American Institute of Mining, Metallurgical, and Petroleum Engineers

Member of the Boston Society of Natural History

Twice awarded by the Walker Award from the Boston Society of Natural History

Bronze medal of the Exposition Universelle (1900).

Personal life 
Wife - Alice Ballard Crosby (since September 4, 1876), son of Irwin Ballard Crosby, geologist, scientist - continuer of the father's case.

References

Bibliography 
 W. O. Crosby Native Bitumens and the Pitch Lake of Trinidad. - The American Naturalist, 1879, Vol. 13, No. 4 (Apr., 1879), pp. 229–246
 W. O. Crosby Common Minerals and Rocks. - Boston Society Natural History, Guides for Science Teaching, No. XII. - Boston, Heath & Co., First edition: 1881. - 205 p.
 Crosby, W. O., 1882, On the classification and origin of joint structures, Proc. Boston Society Natural History, 1882-1883, v. 22, pp. 72-85. - Boston: Printed for the Society 1884.
 W. O. Crosby, I. B. Crosby Keystone faults. Bulletin of the Geological Society of America, 1925, volume 36, pages 623-640.

External links
 Alfred C. Lane William Otis Crosby (1850–1925). In: Proceedings of the American Academy of Arts and Sciences Vol. 64, No. 12 (October, 1930), pp. 518–526
 Nickles, J. M. (1928). Bibliography of North American Geology, 1924-1925 (Vol. 802). US Government Printing Office. William Otis Crosby
 The Online Books Page. Online Books by William Otis Crosby (Crosby, William Otis, 1850-1925) 
 Mineralogical Record. Curtis Schuh's Bibliography of Mineralogy. ABA: I 376, 302-308.
 Adams O.F., Dictionary of American Authors, 1904. - p.80
 Appleton Cyclopedia of American Biography, vol.2, pp.18-19.
 H. W. SHIMER and W. LINDGREN. Memorial of William Otis Crosby. Bulletin Geological Society of America, v. 38, number 1 (March 30, 1927), pp. 34–45., portrait.
 Dictionary of American Biography, v.4, pp. 569-570. - Ed.: Charles Scribner's Sons, NEW YORK, 1930. - 637 p.
 Herringshaw's National Library of American Biography. p.159
 World Biographical Information System (WBIS) Online.
 Who Was Who in America, v.1. 1897-1942, p. 279. - Ed.: New Providence, N.J. Marquis-Who's Who, 1966. - 1418 p.

1850 births
1925 deaths
American geologists
American engineers
Fellows of the Geological Society of America
Fellows of the Seismological Society of America
Fellows of the American Academy of Arts and Sciences
Fellows of the American Institute of Mining, Metallurgical, and Petroleum Engineers
Fellows of the Boston Society of Natural History